Whirl Wind Propellers Corporation, is an American manufacturer of wooden and composite propellers for homebuilt and light-sport aircraft. The company headquarters is located in El Cajon, California.

The company makes composite ground adjustable aircraft propellers as well as replacement blades for the Nanchang CJ-6's V530 propeller and also airboat propellers.

See also
List of aircraft propeller manufacturers

References

External links 

Aircraft propeller manufacturers
Aerospace companies of the United States
Companies based in El Cajon, California